CONvergence is an annual multi-genre fan convention. This all-volunteer, fan-run convention is primarily for enthusiasts of Science Fiction and Fantasy in all media. Their motto is "where science fiction and reality meet". It is one of the most-attended conventions of its kind in North America, with approximately 6,000 paid members every year. The 2022 convention was held across four days at the Hyatt Regency Minneapolis in Minneapolis, Minnesota.

Attractions
The convention is known for several attractions, which are available to members throughout the event.

Art and Merchandise 

 The CONvergence Art Show offers items created by artists around the country. Some are available for a live auction or silent auction. 
 The Artists Alley provides space for artists to offer commissioned art. 
 The Dealers Room features a larger number of vendors selling crafts, apparel, or collectibles.
 The Charity Auction funds community activities provided by the Geek Partnership Society.
 Official CONvergence merchandise is available with branded goods and commemorative event apparel.

Social Attractions 

 The convention is known for its themed room parties hosted by community and fan groups. Each party room is unique from one another, each with varied themes. The walls of the convention are usually plastered with advertisements for different parties.
 Space Lounge presents a futuristic space-themed entertainment venue with music, entertainment, and sensory refreshments.
 Several spaces for gaming are available at CONvergence, with options for board games, card games, and roleplaying games. The gaming area offers LAN-based gaming, tabletop gaming, and Artemis: Spaceship Bridge Simulator, among other things.
 The CONvergence Teen Room is available for members between 13 and 20 years old.

Programming Areas 

 Harmonic CONvergence features live music, spoken word, burlesque, and comedy.
 Cinema Rex is a couch- and sofa-filled movie room. Running popular movies, short films, and film festivals, Cinema Rex provides drinks, popcorn, candy, and other refreshments.
 Theater Nippon presents a series of classic and modern anime with free drinks, popcorn and candy.

Hospitality 
Members of CONvergence have access to ConSuite, with complimentary rice and soups throughout most of the day, and around-the-clock access to candies, veggies, fruits, and chips.

Events 

CONvergence runs many parallel programming tracks, filling several convention rooms simultaneously with panels, speeches, demonstrations, recognitions, and screenings.

Panels 

CONvergence panels are scheduled for each day, across a wide range of topics. Most panels are group discussions in front of an audience, while others are more interactive or performance-based.

Main Stage Events
The Opening and Closing Ceremonies are held on a Main Stage, as well as live performances and other events that require a lot of space.

Masquerade 
The signature Masquerade event is held Saturday night, displaying the best in costuming and cosplay creations, usually with short skits.

Music Events 
Live music sometimes occurs at the Main Stage. Dances and raves are often scheduled for the late hours in the main stage area.

Mascots

The primary mascot of CONvergence is the gynoid "Connie", who is occasionally opposed by Connie's scheming younger sister, "Connie Mk. II".

Guests of Honor 

Like most science fiction conventions, CONvergence selects a few special guests every year.

Timeline
The idea for CONvergence began at a room party held  years ago at the Minicon 33 event, where 500 pre-registrations to CONvergence 1999 were collected.

Reception

In 2008, CONvergence was voted "Best Fan Convention" by the City Pages arts/alternative newspaper. It has appeared in "Best of the Cities" in each year afterward until 2011 (when no award was given for "best fan convention" or "best annual convention").

Transition to Minneapolis 
The announcement indicated changes to the party rooms at the 2018 convention, due to concerns from the hotel management.

On the same day, CONvergence Events, Inc. announced that the following year's convention would be hosted at the Hyatt Regency Minneapolis in downtown Minneapolis, Minnesota, after being hosted in the same Bloomington location since 2001.

References

External links
 CONvergence website
 Convergence Events website

Science fiction conventions in the United States
Conventions in Minnesota
Culture of Minneapolis
Tourist attractions in Minneapolis
1999 establishments in Minnesota
Recurring events established in 1999